Til My Casket Drops is the fourth studio album by American rapper C-Bo, released February 24, 1998 on AWOL Records. The album was produced by C-Bo, DJ Daryl, Mike Mosley, B.C., One Drop Scott and Rick Rock. It peaked at number 4 on the Billboard Top R&B/Hip-Hop Albums and at number 41 on the Billboard 200. Along with a single, a music video was produced for the song "Money by the Ton" featuring Mississippi. The song peaked at #8 on the Bubbling Under R&B/Hip-Hop Singles chart, making it both C-bo and Mississippi's only charting single to date. The album features guest performances by Spice 1, E-40, Big Syke, Outlawz and X-Raided, as well as labelmates Killa Tay and Lunasicc. Mob Figaz made their first appearance on the album.

West Coast Mafia Records, C-Bo's own label, reissued Til My Casket Drops in 2002.

Track listing
"Ride Til' We Die" (featuring 151 & Mob Figaz) - 4:31
"Deadly Game" - 4:55
"Major Pain & Mr. Bossalini" (featuring Spice 1) - 4:30
"Money by the Ton" (featuring Mississippi) - 4:08
"40 & C-Bo" (featuring E-40) - 3:49
"Hard Labor" (featuring Outlawz & Big Lurch) - 4:31
"Raised In Hell" (featuring Big Syke) - 4:22
"Can We All Ball" (featuring Killa Tay & JT the Bigga Figga) - 3:43
"Desperado Outlaws" - 4:31
"Real Niggas" (featuring Mob Figaz) - 4:31
"Professional Ballers" (featuring Marvaless, Pizzo, Mac Mall, JT the Bigga Figga & Killa Tay) - 4:22
"Big Gangsta" (featuring Laroo, Lil Bo & Mob Figaz) - 5:31
"All I Ever Wanted" (featuring Lunasicc & 151) - 4:37
"Boo Yow!" - 3:51
"No Pain No Gain" (featuring Lunasicc & Laroo) - 4:38
"Til My Casket Drops" - 4:12
"357" - 4:05

Chart history

References

External links 
 Til My Casket Drops at Discogs
 Til My Casket Drops at MusicBrainz

C-Bo albums
1998 albums
Albums produced by Rick Rock